The 1979 Nippon Professional Baseball season was the 30th season of operation for the league.

Regular season standings

Central League

Pacific League

Pacific League Playoff
The Pacific League teams with the best first and second-half records met in a best-of-five playoff series to determine the league representative in the Japan Series.

Kintetsu Buffaloes won the series 3-0.

Japan Series

Hiroshima Toyo Carp won the series 4-3.

See also
1979 Major League Baseball season

References

 
1979 in baseball
1979 in Japanese sport